The Fordham University Press is a publishing house, a division of Fordham University, that publishes primarily in the humanities and the social sciences. Fordham University Press was established in 1907 and is headquartered at the university's Lincoln Center campus. It is the oldest Catholic university press in the United States, and the seventh-oldest in the nation.

It has been a member of the Association of University Presses since 1938, and it was a founding charter member of the Association of Jesuit University Presses (AJUP). The press was established "not only to represent and uphold the values and traditions of the University itself, but also to further those values and traditions through the dissemination of scholarly research and ideas".

History
Fordham University Press was established in 1907. After the close of the university's medical school in 1922, the press operated under the Graduate School of Arts and Sciences and began publishing textbooks in education, English, law, philosophy, and psychology.

The press was headquartered in the Canisius Hall building in the Rose Hill campus for over 100 years. In March 2017, the press relocated from its original headquarters at the university's Rose Hill campus in the Bronx to the Lincoln Center campus in Manhattan.

Series

Initiatives
The American Literatures Initiative
The Modern Language Initiative

Bestselling publications
Greek: An Intensive Course by Hardy Hansen and Gerald Quinn 
Autobiography of St. Ignatius Loyola by John C. Olin 
Deconstruction in a Nutshell by John D. Caputo 
Giving an Account of Oneself by Judith Butler 
Love of Learning and Desire for God by Jean Leclercq, O.S.B. 
Red Tail Captured, Red Tail Free by Alexander Jefferson 
Under the Sidewalks of New York by Brian Cudahy 
Byzantine Theology by John Meyendorff 
Irish Brigade and Its Campaign by David P. Conyngham 
An Aquinas Reader Edited by Mary T. Clark 
The Street Book by Henry Moscow 
The Search for Major Plagge by Michael Good

See also
 List of English-language book publishing companies
 List of university presses

References

External links
 Official site

University Press
Association of Jesuit University Presses
University presses of the United States
1907 establishments in New York City
Publishing companies established in 1907
Book publishing companies based in New York (state)